Gustav Frederik Esmann (August 17, 1860 – September 4, 1904) was a Danish journalist, author, scriptwriter, and master of ceremonies.

Esmann was among those who joined Herman Bang's circle, and in the 1880s he attracted attention as a feature writer in the newspapers. He made his debut as an author in 1885 with Gammel Gæld (Old Debt), two short stories written in a blasé and ironic tone, and he wrote a dozen plays that were noted for their great technical stage finesse, including Den kjære Familje (The Dear Family, 1892) and Alexander den Store (Alexander the Great, 1900). Most of his plays were performed at the Royal Danish Theatre, and his last two were also performed in Sweden. In his lifestyle, Esmann was a typical representative of the "Copenhagen boulevard intelligentsia."

On September 4, 1904, Esmann was shot and killed at a hotel in Copenhagen by his mistress Karen Hammerich (1875–1904).

References

1860 births
1904 deaths
19th-century Danish writers
19th-century male writers
19th-century Danish journalists
19th-century Danish dramatists and playwrights
Danish male screenwriters
Deaths by firearm in Denmark
Writers from Copenhagen
20th-century screenwriters
Murder–suicides in Europe